Cornelia Müller is a linguist who works on pragmatic features of semantics, particularly metaphors in gesture. She is the Chair for Language Use and Multimodal Communication at Europa-Universität Viadrina Frankfurt (Oder). Müller along with Adam Kendon was a founding editor of Gesture, a peer reviewed journal published since 2001, and is a current member of the editorial board. Müller was also a founding editor of the Gesture Studies monograph series for Benjamins, with Kendon, from 2000–2009. Müller was a program chair for the 4th Conference of the International Society for Gesture Studies (ISGS) in 2010.

Selected publications 
 Müller, Cornelia, Alan Cienki, Ellen Fricke, Silva H. Ladewig, David McNeill and Sedinha Teßendorf (eds). 2013. Body – Language – Communication: An International Handbook on Multimodality in Human Interaction, Vol. 1. (Handbooks of Linguistics and Communication Science 38.1.). Berlin/ Boston: De Gruyter Mouton.
 Müller, Cornelia, Alan Cienki, Ellen Fricke, Silva H. Ladewig, David McNeill and Jana Bressem (eds). 2014. Body – Language – Communication: An International Handbook on Multimodality in Human Interaction, Vol. 2. (Handbooks of Linguistics and Communication Science 38.2.). Berlin/ Boston: De Gruyter Mouton.
 Müller, Cornelia. 2008. Metaphors Dead and Alive, Sleeping and Waking. A Dynamic View. Chicago: University of Chicago Press.
 Müller, Cornelia and Roland Posner (eds). 2004. The semantics and pragmatics of everyday gestures. Berlin: Weidler.

References

External links 
Faculty page at Europa-Universität Viadrina: https://www.kuwi.europa-uni.de/en/lehrstuhl/sw/sw0/lehrstuhlinhaberin/index.html

History of the ISGS (written by Müller): https://web.archive.org/web/20161011231434/http://www.gesturestudies.com/history.php

Linguists from Germany
Living people
Women linguists
Year of birth missing (living people)